Malviya Nagar Assembly constituency is one of the seventy Delhi assembly constituencies of Delhi in northern India. It includes the Malviya Nagar area in South Delhi
Malviya Nagar assembly constituency is a part of New Delhi (Lok Sabha constituency).

Extent of the constituency
The assembly constituency comes under Municipal Corporation of Delhi. It comprises the following wards :

Members of Legislative Assembly
Key

Election results

2020

2015

2013

2008

2003

1998

1993

References

Assembly constituencies of Delhi
Delhi Legislative Assembly
South Delhi district
Memorials to Madan Mohan Malaviya